Scrobipalpa manhunkai is a moth in the family Gelechiidae. It was described by Povolný in 1979. It is found in Tunisia.

References

Scrobipalpa
Moths described in 1979